Jakim Maulana (November 6, 1993 – July 14, 2022), known professionally as Jak Knight, was an American actor, comedian and writer. He was best known for his roles as DeVon in the animated Netflix sitcom Big Mouth and Jak in the Peacock comedy series Bust Down.

Early life
Knight was born as Jakim Maulana in Seattle, Washington, on November 6, 1993.

Career
He appeared in the 2014 movie LieGuys as an iPhone cameraman in his debut acting role.

From 2017 until his death in 2022, he provided the voice of DeVon in the Netflix adult animated sitcom Big Mouth.

In 2020, he provided vocal passages as interludes on Limbo, an album made by hip-hop artist and friend of Knight, Aminé.

In March 2022, four months before his death, he starred in the Peacock comedy series Bust Down, alongside Langston Kerman, Chris Redd and Sam Jay.

Personal life
He resided in Los Angeles.

Death
On July 14, 2022, Knight was found dead on an embankment in Los Angeles, California, at age 28. His cause of death was determined to be suicide by gunshot. Many celebrities, including Kumail Nanjiani, Tim Dillon, Max Silvestri, James Adomian, Chance the Rapper, Hannibal Buress, Blake Anderson and Vanessa Ramos, have reacted to Knight's death with tribute quotes on Twitter.

Filmography

References

External links
 

1993 births
2022 deaths
2022 suicides
American male film actors
American male television actors
American male voice actors
21st-century American comedians
African-American male actors
Male actors from Seattle
21st-century American male actors
21st-century African-American people
African-American comedians
Comedians from Washington (state)
American male comedians
African-American screenwriters
American male television writers
American television writers
21st-century American screenwriters
21st-century American male writers
Screenwriters from Washington (state)
Writers from Seattle
Suicides by firearm in California